"A Friend for Life" is a song by British singer-songwriter Steve Harley, which was released by Intrinsic Records in 2001 as a non-album single. The song was written by Harley and former Cockney Rebel guitarist Jim Cregan, and produced by Cregan. Harley's first release of new material since his 1996 album Poetic Justice, "A Friend for Life" was later included on Steve Harley & Cockney Rebel's sixth studio album The Quality of Mercy (2005).

Harley originally offered "A Friend for Life" to British singer Rod Stewart in 2000. The singer declined to record the song, but later included a version on his twenty-ninth studio album Another Country (2015).

Writing and recording
"A Friend for Life" was written during Harley's stay with Cregan at his home in Los Angeles during 2000. Harley wrote the song's lyrics on his return flight back to the UK. In 2015, he recalled, "I was in Los Angeles, staying at Jim's (then) house. We wrote most days and that tune came from one lazy afternoon's messing about. I wrote the entire lyric on the flight home." Later in the year, Harley recorded the song at friend and songwriter Mike Batt's home studio, with Cregan as the producer. Batt arranged and conducted the string quartet and also played keyboards on the track. The recording of "A Friend for Life" inspired Batt to record extensively at his home and most of Katie Melua's recordings have since been made there.

In a 2003 interview for the fan site The Harley Fanzone, Cregan spoke of his role as producer on the song, "We did 'A Friend for Life' together which was a real change for me because suddenly instead of Steve being the producer, I was. I thought, 'this could be strange' because he had always been the man in charge. Was he going to let go of the reins? How hard was that going to be? But it was fine – he obviously put his two cents in." In a 2013 interview, Harley was asked which of his songs did he consider to be a "hidden gem" and one that people should listen to. He replied, "There's a song called 'A Friend for Life'. It touches people of a certain age. A lot of my audience are grandparents, 50s and 60s. It touches them."

Release
"A Friend for Life" was recorded during a period when Harley was seeking to record a new studio album. During 2000, he began talks with various record labels over a potential album release. In an online diary entry in September that year, Harley said, "Negotiations are taking place daily and constantly. I am determined that 'A Friend for Life' will be available in the shops and on the radio in time for the next Spring band tour, with an album, God willing, in the can." By 2001, Harley's company Comeuppance Ltd had made a licensing agreement with Intrinsic Records for the release of "A Friend for Life" as a single, but no new studio album would materialise until 2005's The Quality of Mercy.

In a January 2001 diary entry, Harley gave an update on the song's release: 

"A Friend for Life" was released by Intrinsic Records on CD in the UK only, with Pinnacle Records handling its distribution. The single featured two extra tracks, "Safe" and "Loretta's Tale", both being recorded live at the Bloomsbury Theatre in London in the spring of 2000. "Safe" was originally recorded for the 1996 album Poetic Justice and "Loretta's Tale" for Cockney Rebel's 1973 debut album The Human Menagerie.

The song began to gain airplay in March and was released as a single in April, coinciding with Steve Harley & Cockney Rebel's 'Back with the Band' tour – a 38 date UK tour which was the band's first in four years. It reached number 125 in the UK Singles Chart in May 2001 and stayed in the top 200 for four weeks. It also reached number 45 in the UK Independent Singles Chart.

"A Friend for Life" was later included on the Steve Harley & Cockney Rebel album The Quality of Mercy, which was released in 2005. As Harley was happy with the original recording, no changes were made to the song, although the track's producer credits were changed to both Cregan and Harley.

Critical reception
In a 2005 review of Anytime! (A Live Set), Peter Makowski of Classic Rock commented, "It's the lesser-known material like the emotive 'A Friend For Life' that makes Harley sound fresh and edgy, like a latter day Libertine". In a review of The Quality of Mercy, Nick Dalton of Record Collector described the song as "reflective" and noted Cregan's "delicate solo". The Sunday Express commented, "A genuine Seventies pop maverick, Harley has evolved into a highly-literate and intimate balladeer. 'The Coast of Amalfi' and 'A Friend for Life' are elegant if care-worn gems." Carol Clerk of Classic Rock noted the song's "lovely, gentle melod[y]". Nick Hasted of Uncut was critical of the album, but added that "A Friend for Life" "retains some brutal Cockney bite about married stasis".

Live performances
"A Friend for Life" was included in the set-list of the band's 2001 tour and has remained a regular inclusion at Harley's live shows to date. Some live versions have been recorded for official releases, including Acoustic and Pure: Live (2003), Anytime! (A Live Set) (2004) and Live at the Isle of Wight Festival (2005).

In 2011, Harley performed the song live with Cockney Rebel members Barry Wickens and James Lascelles alongside the "Herreavdelingen" radio show's orchestra at the NRK Marienlyst in Oslo, Norway. Harley also performed the song as a bonus session track that year for the BBC Radio 2 Bob Harris show Old Grey Whistle Test 40, which was released on the box-set compilation The Old Grey Whistle Test Live.

Track listing
CD single
"The Last Goodbye" – 4:45
"Safe" (Live) – 4:08
"Loretta's Tale" (Live) – 6:35

Personnel
A Friend for Life
 Steve Harley – vocals, bass
 Jim Cregan – guitar, producer
 Robbie Gladwell – guitar
 Mike Batt – piano, arranger and conductor of String Quartet
 Matt Butler – recording and mixing engineer
 Steve Sale – assistant recording and mixing engineer

Safe (Live)
 Steve Harley – vocals
 Robbie Gladwell – guitar
 Lily Gonzales – backing vocals

Loretta's Tale (Live)
 Steve Harley – vocals
 Robbie Gladwell – guitar

Other
 Kitrocket UK – sleeve
 Doug Shearer – mastering

Charts

Rod Stewart version

In 2005, British singer Rod Stewart released a version of "A Friend for Life" on his twenty-ninth studio album Another Country. As a friend of his for many years, Stewart has described Harley as "one of the finest lyricists the UK has ever produced".

Shortly after the song was written in 2000, Harley offered the song to Stewart. Harley revealed in a November 2000 diary entry, "Gave 'A Friend for Life' to Rod Stewart at dinner the other night. He loves the song but said: 'I don't like that line about 'The cats, I'll feed yer cats...' I'll be releasing my version in the new year, but I am not averse to a world-superstar having a world-wide number one with the song. No matter."

After Stewart recorded the song for Another Country, Harley revealed in a June 2015 diary entry that an "international superstar" had recorded one of his songs. He added, "I believe totally that you will love it. I have it (the superstar sent me a file by email) and it is, for me, a beautiful reading of a slightly complex lyric. That's why the superstar is a superstar, I guess." Stewart's version of the song was first played on BBC Radio 2 on 31 August, when Stewart appeared on the "Johnnie Walker Meets..." show. During the show, Stewart said Harley was "over the moon" about Stewart covering the song and added that he is "one of the most underrated songwriters".

In an October 2015 interview with Classic Rock, Harley commented on Stewart's version, "Was I happy with that? Just a bit! Rod really nails it in his old soul voice." Speaking to The Leader in November 2016, Harley spoke again of Stewart's version, "I offered it to him over 10 years ago and he didn't get it, but now he's had these two lovely boys with Penny Lancaster and he gets it because it's a difficult lyric about children growing up and leaving the nest. I thanked him by buying him a fish supper in a very expensive restaurant in Mayfair."

References

2001 songs
2001 singles
Steve Harley songs
Rod Stewart songs
Songs written by Steve Harley
Songs written by Jim Cregan